Visiting Hours may refer to:

 Visiting Hours (film), a 1982 Canadian horror film starring Michael Ironside
 "Visiting Hours" (song), by Ed Sheeran, 2021
 "Visiting Hours", a song by Cardiac Arrest (later Cardiacs) from The Obvious Identity, 1980
 "Visiting Hours", a song by Kero Kero Bonito from Time 'n' Place, 2018
 "Visiting Hours", an independent record label established by Joe Darone in 2005

See also
"Visiting Ours", an episode of the first season of Arrested Development